Danny Malin is a British YouTube personality. He is the host of the YouTube series Rate My Takeaway, in which he visits and reviews takeaway food shops, mainly in Northern England, although some reviews have included London, New York, Los Angeles, Las Vegas and various cities in Scotland, Wales and Ireland.  Rate My Takeaway has over 582,000 subscribers and over 104 million views since it began in June 2020.

In December 2021 Malin launched a charity single called `Santa's Takeaway` in a bid to get the Christmas number one single. Trussell Trust and MIND were the charities to benefit.

Format
Malin begins each show with the greeting, "Now then guys, how are you doin'? Back on the road again!" He then announces the city and takeaway shop he will be visiting, with his "cameraman" filming the journey. Upon arrival, Malin takes a folding table and folding chair from the boot of his car and proceeds to the shop. After engaging with the counter staff, he will order several courses then set up his table and chair outside the shop. When the meal arrives, he will taste and comment on each course. Finally, when he rates the takeaway, he ends it with a comment in his characteristically strong accent, such as, "If I'm honest wi' yer, it's a solid nine from me."

Businesses have reported a surge in business following reviews by Malin.

As Malin's popularity has increased, his reviews are often interrupted by fans seeking a chat or a selfie.

The chair
Malin had used the same camping chair for all his broadcasts. However, during the episode that aired on 10 January 2022, the chair broke after a safety pin snapped on it causing Malin to fall down. The broken chair was subsequently sold for charity on the internet auction site eBay. The money raised would go to the buyer's charity of choice. The highest bid exceeded £50,000 but the bid was not honoured. The fate of the chair is unknown.

United States tour
In August 2022, Rate My Takeway embarked on a tour of the United States. Destinations for reviews included New York, Las Vegas and Los Angeles.

As part of the tour, Malin met up with long-time fan of the show Josh Weinstein, who was a writer of The Simpsons. They had a chat over a burger and fries at Marina Del Rey.

Personal life
Malin was born in Barnsley. He now resides in Leeds, West Yorkshire, where he worked at a butcher's shop in Kirkgate Market. His longtime partner Carrie Taylor died suddenly of a heart attack in February 2021. They had two children, and Carrie had a son from a previous relationship. In December 2022, Malin announced his engagement to journalist Sophie Mei Lan.

In 2022, Malin became a silent business partner in Brody's burger restaurant in Pudsey.

Malin is a supporter of Barnsley F.C..

References 

1980 births
Living people
British YouTubers
People from Barnsley
People from Leeds
Food and cooking YouTubers